"Forever and for Always" is a song by Canadian country music singer Shania Twain and it was the third country single from her fourth studio album Up! (2002). The song was written by her then-husband Robert John "Mutt" Lange and Twain. The single was released in the United States radio on April 7, 2003. The video debuted on Country Music Television on April 26, 2003. The song was also used for Febreze: Scentstories promotion, in which Twain took part. In 2006, "Forever and for Always" was certified gold for 500,000 digital downloads in the U.S. by the RIAA.

"Forever and for Always" was nominated for two Grammy Awards in 2004, Best Country Song and Best Female Country Vocal Performance; however, it lost in both categories. The song was also named Song of the Year at both the 2004 BMI Country Songwriter Awards and 2004 European BMI Awards (validated only for Shania Twain's shares, Mutt's shares are ASCAP-controlled).

Background
Twain said there is something inspirational to her about people who start relationships when they are kids, and are still in love when they are older. Twain really enjoyed doing the video for the song, because she was able to realize that visually. She said it is one of her favorite songs.

In December 2019, during the Let's Go! residency in Las Vegas, Twain revealed for the first time that the song had been recorded by her friend Prince, but that his version was never released and instead remained part of his private collection.  The performance was Twain's first of "Forever And For Always" in over 15 years and was dedicated to the late singer.

Composition 
"Forever and for Always" is performed in the key of G major in  time following a chord progression of G–G2–C–D, and Twain's vocals span from G3 to E5. The song moves at a tempo of 86 beats per minute.

Music video
The music video for "Forever and for Always" was shot at Bethells Beach in New Zealand in March 2003. It was directed by Paul Boyd, who shot her "When You Kiss Me" video around the same time also in New Zealand. It debuted on Country Music Television (CMT) on April 26, 2003. The video shows two children at the beach together, then it shows them as teens, and eventually seniors, visualizing the theme of the song of staying together forever. Scenes of Twain at the beach are intercut throughout the video. The video was released with both the 'red' and 'green' versions, with each also having an 'all performance' video of only Twain at the beach. The video released a 'blue' version internationally as well. The video won the Female Video of the Year Award at the 2004 CMT Flameworthy Awards, and was nominated for Video of the Year at the 2003 Canadian Country Music Awards, but lost to another song by Twain, "I'm Gonna Getcha Good!". The video is available on select singles, and the DVD-Audio version of Up!.

Critical reception
Billboard magazine contrasted the song against the previous two singles, saying it "relies less on cutesy gimmicks (and exclamation marks) and focuses thematically on steadfast love," while comparing it to Shania's earlier singles "From This Moment On" and "You're Still the One". About.com ranked the song 95th for the top 100 pop songs of 2003.

Chart performance
"Forever and for Always" debuted on the Billboard Hot Country Singles & Tracks chart the week of April 12, 2003, at number 60. The single spent 26 weeks on the chart and climbed to a peak position of number four on September 6, 2003, where it remained for one week. "Forever and for Always" became Twain's 14th top-10 single and 19th top-20 single.

On the adult contemporary chart, "Forever and for Always" debuted at number 30 the week of May 10, 2003. The single spent 77 weeks on the chart and slowly climbed to a peak position of number one on November 15, 2003, where it remained for six non-consecutive weeks. "Forever and for Always" became Twain's third number one, sixth top-10 single and seventh consecutive top-20 single.

"Forever and for Always" debuted on the Billboard Hot 100 on May 24, 2003, at number 75. It spent 23 weeks on the chart and peaked at number 20 on September 6, 2003, becoming Twain's fourth-most-successful single on the chart. The single reached number 17 on the airplay chart. "Forever and for Always" became Twain's fourth top-20 single and ninth top-40 single.

"Forever and for Always" proved to be successful internationally, becoming Twain's fifth biggest single in the UK. It debuted on June 14, 2003, at its peak at number six. This made it her seventh consecutive, eighth overall, top-10 single. It remained on the entire chart for 10 weeks. In all, "Forever and for Always" hit the top-10 in six countries: Austria, Canada, Germany, Ireland, Romania, and the UK.

Track listings

UK CD single part 1
 "Forever and for Always" (edit) – 4:10
 "Man! I Feel Like a Woman!" (live) – 3:58
 "Don't Be Stupid" (live) – 3:58
 Enhanced: "Forever and for Always" (video)

UK CD single part 2
 "Forever and for Always" (edit) – 4:10
 "That Don't Impress Me Much" (live) – 3:47
 "Come On Over" (live) – 3:00
 Enhanced: "Forever and for Always" (original red version—music video)

Australia maxi-CD
 "Forever and for Always" (red) – 4:05
 "Forever and for Always" (green) – 4:44
 "Man! I Feel Like a Woman!" (live) – 3:56
 "That Don't Impress Me Much" (live) – 3:45
 "Come On Over" (live) – 3:00

European and Canadian CD single
 "Forever and for Always" (red) – 4:08
 "That Don't Impress Me Much" (live) – 3:54

German 3-inch CD single
 "Forever and for Always" (red) – 4:08
 "Ka-Ching!" (red album version) – 3:20

European CD single
 "Forever and for Always" (red) – 4:09
 "Ka-Ching!" (red) – 3:21
 "That Don't Impress Me Much" (live) – 3:46
 "Come On Over" (live) – 3:01

European CD single
 "Forever and for Always" (red) – 4:08
 "Man! I Feel Like a Woman!" (live) – 3:56
 "Don't Be Stupid" (live) – 3:58
 Enhanced: "Forever and for Always" (video)

Charts

Weekly charts

Year-end charts

Decade-end charts

All-time charts

Certifications

Release history

References

See also
List of Billboard Adult Contemporary number ones of 2003 and 2004 (U.S.)

2002 songs
2003 singles
Country ballads
Mercury Records singles
Mercury Nashville singles
Music videos directed by Paul Boyd
Shania Twain songs
Song recordings produced by Robert John "Mutt" Lange
Songs written by Robert John "Mutt" Lange
Songs written by Shania Twain